Eugene H. Comstock (February 21, 1910 – February 1, 1981) was a NASCAR Grand National Series driver from Chesapeake, Ohio, USA.

Gene is the eldest son of Mr. and Mrs. Pearle Francis (P.F.) Comstock and was associated with operating gas-powered vehicles for the majority of his life.

Career
Comstock started driving race cars in the 1930s and drove to the late 1960s. Comstock was a multi-talented driver who drove midgets, sprint cars, super-modify, and stock cars. He had many wins on the short tracks around the country and was considered by many to be one of the top drivers from his area.

In his career spanning from 1950 to 1955, Gene racked up one top-five position, six top-ten positions, 3038.6 miles of racing experience, and $2,549 ($ when adjusted for inflation) in take home pay. He competed in the 1955 Southern 500 in a 1954 Hudson Hornet as a driver/owner.

Comstock was one of the drivers who raced in the first Darlington race in 1950. He competed in a new Oldsmobile purchased by a bootlegger from Ironton, Ohio. He finished 18th in the race. According to the Darlington newspaper, at 125 miles, Johnny Mantz was leading with Fireball Roberts in second and Comstock in third. Harold Brasington (Track Owner) was reported to have told Comstock after the race that he thought he was going to win the race until he broke the right front hub around the  425th mile of the race.

References

External links
 

1910 births
1981 deaths
NASCAR drivers
People from Lawrence County, Ohio
Racing drivers from Ohio
People from Putnam County, West Virginia